Walt Disney Records is an American record label of the Disney Music Group. The label releases soundtrack albums from The Walt Disney Company's motion picture studios, television series, theme parks, and traditional studio albums produced by its roster of pop, teen pop, and country artists.

The label was founded on February 4, 1956 as Disneyland Records. Before that time, Disney recordings were licensed to a variety of other labels such as RCA, Decca, Capitol, ABC-Paramount, and United Artists. It was Disney Legend Jimmy Johnson who convinced Walt Disney’s brother Roy O. Disney that Walt Disney Productions (now The Walt Disney Company) should form their own record label. It adopted its current name in 1989 for the flagship Disney Music Group label and is distributed by Universal Music Group.

History 
Disneyland Records was predicated by non-soundtrack audio material based on Davy Crockett miniseries from the Disneyland anthology television series, along with the song, "The Ballad of Davy Crockett," both featuring series star Fess Parker. These were licensed to Columbia Records, but the smaller Cadence Records label released the more successful "Ballad of Davy Crockett" sung by Bill Hayes faster, and this was the record that topped the charts instead. The following year, Disney saw profits for Mickey Mouse Club records in the millions being shared with Golden Records and ABC Records, finally convincing Roy to allow Johnson to start the in-house Disneyland Records.

Disneyland Records 

The company was founded as Disneyland Records on February 4, 1956, with Jimmy Johnson as president, serving as the recorded unit of Walt Disney Productions. Johnson brought in musician Tutti Camarata to head the Artists and Repertoire department of this new enterprise.One ten-inch LP with the "Disneyland" imprint had been released a few months earlier, a musical version of A Child's Garden of Verses, but it was distributed by the Charles Hansen music publishing company. The very first Disneyland Record produced, manufactured, marketed and distributed by the label was Walt Disney Takes You to Disneyland, the only album Walt had ever recorded especially for his own record company. Also in the first year, seven Disney animated movie soundtracks were issued by the company.

Disneyland Records issued Parker's "Wringle Wrangle" single from the Westward Ho the Wagons! film within a year of starting operations; the single became a hit. This led the company to start recording music from outside the films. However, what ever was released by the company the industry categorized as children. Pricing was directed towards an adult audience, which was more than standard children fare. The only outside success was Camarata’s album "Tutti's Trumpets". Thus in 1959, the Disneyland label became the soundtrack and children's label and Buena Vista label for the occasional pop song record.

Camarata established the label's initial forays into long-form musical albums, which included jazz interpretations of Disney standards from Snow White and the Seven Dwarfs, Bambi, and Cinderella, as well as original musical concept albums, and he expanded the format of soundtracks by including selections from the score as well as the songs. Tutti's connections within the music industry also brought to the label the likes of Mary Martin, Louis Armstrong, Louis Prima and Phil Harris. After popular Mouseketeer, Annette Funicello, sang a song called "How Will I Know My Love" on the Mickey Mouse Club TV series, fans contacted the studio for the record, which became a minor hit. This prompted Camarata, Johnson and Walt Disney to encourage Annette's career as the label's first artist in residence. In 1959, the Buena Vista Records label was formed for Funicello's select recordings, soundtrack albums and other contemporary audiophile music.

While looking for the right material for Annette, Tutti and his team discovered the songwriting duo of Richard M. Sherman and Robert B. Sherman after hearing one of their songs on the radio. The two were brought to the Disney studio in Burbank where they eventually became the first staff songwriters for the company.With the participation of the Sherman brothers and two technicians at Sunset Sound in Hollywood, Camarata developed his renowned "Annette Sound," a specific type of double/reverb recording to strengthen Annette's voice that became an industry standard. The Shermans penned not only a good deal of Annette's songs, but were also responsible for most of the iconic Disney songs of the 1960s and beyond – “It's a Small World” and “The Tiki Tiki Tiki Room” for the theme parks, as well as the songs from Mary Poppins, Winnie the Pooh and the Honey Tree, The Jungle Book, Winnie the Pooh and the Blustery Day and Bedknobs and Broomsticks. 

In 1960, Camarata left the staff but under Roy O. Disney's suggestion, established his own full-service recording studio where most of Disney and Buena Vista's records were recorded, mixed, engineered, cut and mastered, the Los Angeles landmark, Sunset Sound. In effect he was associated with Disney until the early seventies. Disneyland Records started its read-along series in 1965 with singer/actor Robie Lester performer appearing on more titles than any other in the history of the label.

By 1971, Disneyland Records was also called Disneyland/Vista Records. Also, A Child's Garden of Verses was still in their line. Disneyland/Vista worked with Rankin/Bass to release six recordings tied to The Hobbit 1977 animated film as Rankin/Bass had Disneyland/Vista do soundtrack for two of their earlier holiday specials, Frosty's Winter Wonderland and ’Twas the Night Before Christmas.

The company was so successful with its Mickey Mouse Disco album that Disneyland looked to expand again into pop music by October 1980. Its success also lead to the issuance of animated theatrical shorts based on songs from the album. Two such original productions were "That Waddlin' Crazy Guy" and "Pardners" featuring the comedy singing team of Willio and Phillio (Will Ryan and Phil Baron).

Walt Disney Records 
In 1989, Disneyland Records was renamed Walt Disney Records.

About 1990, Walt Disney Records signed several youth targeted acts like Parachute Express and Norman Foote. Disney let these act go after several years as their mandate was changed to support the animated features, produce book and tape packages and compilations to take advantage of the catalog.

In May 2000, Walt Disney Records signed the label's first teen singer, Myra; her first single with the label, "Magic Carpet Ride", was released May 23, 2000 as a part of La Vida Mickey album.

On June 24, 2014, Walt Disney Records started releasing The Legacy Collection. The series includes original soundtracks, as well as unreleased music, and composer and producer liner notes. As of 2022, the collection includes 16 albums ranging between various anniversaries of various Disney films and Disneyland.

With Disney's purchase of Lucasfilm on December 21, 2012, it became the official label for the studio and all Star Wars-related soundtracks, beginning with The Force Awakens soundtrack on December 18, 2015. In January 2017, Disney acquired the distribution rights to the entire Star Wars music catalog from Sony Classical; the soundtrack albums from the first six films were then released by Walt Disney Records in digital formats the same day. Disney digitally remastered and reissued the original Star Wars soundtrack albums in physical formats on May 4, 2018.

Albums 

 Notable soundtracks and scores
 Snow White and the Seven Dwarfs (1956)
 Pinocchio (1956)
 Bambi (1956)
 Cinderella (1956)
 Fantasia (1957)
 Alice in Wonderland (1957)
 Sleeping Beauty (1959)
 Mary Poppins (1964)
 The Little Mermaid (1989)
 Beauty and the Beast (1991)
 The Lion King (1994)
 Tarzan (1999)
 Tron: Legacy (2010)
 Frozen (2013)
 Moana (2016)
Encanto (2021)

 Compilations
 Walt Disney Takes You to Disneyland (1956)
 Walt Disney's Music Cavalcade (1959)
 For Our Children (2003)
 The Disney Princess Christmas Album (2007)
 Disney Channel Holiday Playlist (2012)
 Disney Classics (Box Set, 2013)
 The Silly Symphony Collection (2015)
 Disney Holidays Unwrapped (2013)
 Disney Channel Play It Loud (2014)
 Dconstructed (April 22, 2014) Disney tunes remix by EDM stars

 Album series
 Walt Disney Record Classic Soundtrack Series
 Disney Archive Collection Series
 Disneymania
 Radio Disney Jams
 Disney Karaoke Series
 We Love Disney (2013–present)
 Walt Disney Records: The Legacy Collection (2014–2015, 2017–present)

See also 
 List of record labels
 Hollywood Records
 Fox Music

References

External links 
 Mouse Tracks: The Story of Walt Disney Records
 Walt Disney Records Database
 Columbia.edu

 
American companies established in 1956
American record labels
Record labels based in California
Disney Music Group
Pop record labels
Soundtrack record labels
Companies based in Burbank, California
Labels distributed by Universal Music Group
Record labels established in 1956
1956 establishments in California
Children's record labels